Gremyashchiy is the lead ship of the s of the Russian Navy.

Development and design 

Gremyashchiy-class corvettes are very large multipurpose vessels, designed to complement the Steregushchiy class already being commissioned with the Russian Navy. They have been designed to have an improved habitability for higher endurance missions, and are able to launch cruise missiles.

The class was designed with German MTU diesels for propulsion. However, because of sanctions arising from the Ukrainian conflict, deliveries of MTU diesels beyond the first two units were stopped, resulting in the cancellation of further units. Instead, new units of the preceding Steregushchiy class are being ordered. In May 2016, corvette Gremyashchiy got two Russian-made 16D49 diesel turbines 1DDA-12000 from Kolomna Plant in St Petersburg, replacing the previously required German MTU diesels.

Project 20385 differs from its predecessor by greater dimensions and displacement. They have a steel hull and composite superstructure, with a bulbous bow and nine watertight subdivisions. Compared with the Soobrazitelny, Boikiy, Sovershennyy and Stoikiy ships, which are fitted with Redut air defense VLS system of 12 launchers on the bow, these new ships are equipped with a UKSK VLS system comprising eight launchers for either Kalibr, Oniks or Zircon anti-ship/cruise missiles. The Redut VLS system with 16 launchers has been placed on the stern. Another difference is the lack of the aft mast above the helicopter hangar, and single integrated mainmast that no longer includes separate open shelves for artillery and navigation radars.

Construction and career 
Gremyashchiy was laid down on 1 February 2012, and launched on 30 June 2017 by Severnaya Verf in Saint Petersburg. She was commissioned on 29 December 2020. In August 2021, the ship began her transit from the Baltic to the Pacific Fleet. She arrived at her home port of Vladivostok in November 2021.

On the 21 to 23 June 2022, Gremyashchiy and the frigate Marshal Shaposhnikov visited the port of Manila in the Philippines.

On 25 July 2022 she arrived at the point of her permanent basing Petropavlovsk-Kamchatsky.

Gallery

References 

2017 ships
Ships built at Severnaya Verf
Naval ships of Russia